Alaena ochracea is a butterfly in the family Lycaenidae. It is found in Malawi (from the southern part of the country to the Shire Highlands). The habitat consists of the fringes of submontane evergreen forests.

References

Butterflies described in 1965
Alaena
Endemic fauna of Malawi
Butterflies of Africa